Bigirimana is a Burundian surname. Notable people with the surname include:

 Balthazar Bigirimana (1957–2012), Burundian politician and diplomat
 Blaise Bigirimana (born 1998), Burundian footballer
 Gaël Bigirimana (born 1993), Burundian footballer

Surnames of Burundian origin